HTMS Bhumibol Adulyadej (FFG-471), is the lead ship of her class of frigates for the Royal Thai Navy, developed from the . The DW-3000F hull is different from the Gwanggaeto the Great-class destroyer, due to the design of the ship having reduced radar cross section, and there are many other additional technologies added.

Planning and acquisition
DW3000F or HTMS. Bhumibol Adulyadej (FFG-471) It is a project to acquire two naval high-performance frigates. The project started in 2012 and was signed for purchase in 2013 from Daewoo Shipbuilding & Marine Engineering Co., Ltd. (DSME) from South Korea. The total cost of building a boat is approximately 14,997 million baht.
Which is the price including VAT Spare parts, tools, documents, support, testing, trials, training, technology transfer, etc. Which is a 6-year commitment. In this series of shipbuilding, the Navy inherited shipbuilding technology. To strengthen domestic shipbuilding capabilities The Royal Thai Navy will build another high-performance frigate.

Design
HTMS Bhumibol Adulyadej was constructed in South Korea. It is the first ship of the High-Performance Frigate Boat Project of the Royal Thai Navy. It is able to perform 3D combat operations on both the surface, underwater and air. It was commissioned on January 7, 2019, with the original name as HTMS Tha Chin. Later, with the royal benevolence of His Majesty King Vajiralongkorn, bestowed with the new name HTMS Bhumibol Adulyadej.

Design and construction
The ship was developed based on the South Korean Navy Gwanggaeto the Great-class destroyer (KDX-I). The ship was built at Daewoo Shipbuilding & Marine Engineering Co., Ltd, South Korea, from 2013 to 2018. The hull is designed using Stealth Technology. Both the hull and its systems are focused on reducing detection by opponents. And reduce heat radiation Reduces radar reflection and noise. The naval combat system is linked to the Air Force aircraft Link E, Link RTN, especially the link with HTMS Naresuan (FFG-421), HTMS Taksin (FFG-422) and HTMS Chakri Naruebet (CVH-911) with Link G, the Jas-39 Gripen multirole fighter aircraft is the Air Force's most advanced 4.5 generation fighter. As part of the development of Network Centric Warfare. High-performance frigates Designed hull and structure Support for improvements to be able to fire the RIM-66 Standard MR ground-to-air missile, including a plan to support it. The companies involved in the assembly system include the launch pad, the vertical missile launcher (Mk.41 VLS), the combat system. Fire control radar and target radar (Illuminator) can be improved to support the firing of such launch weapons when the Navy needs it and the budget situation allows.

Mission
The mission of wartime is to protect Thailand's maritime sovereignty and protect the transport process. The mission of peacetime is to maintain the security and safety of maritime transport routes, safeguard maritime sovereignty, search and rescue marine victims, humanitarian and disaster relief, and uphold naval legislation.

Capacity
Typical capabilities are sea resistance up to 6-8 sea conditions. Strong hull structure. There is a high chance of survival in a hostile environment of nuclear, chemical, and biochemical contamination.

Capacity Control, command and surveillance With modern combat and surveillance systems and high capabilities. As well as being able to link information and communicate with ships, aircraft and onshore units. As well as being able to monitor every dimension and day and night.

Combat capability It is able to perform combat operations in 3D with the first priority in underwater warfare operations. It can detect targets at a distance with the rear sonar and the bottom sonar. Then hit the submarine at a distance with the Vertical Launch Anti-Submarine Rocket or torpedoes and the second. War operations against air threats It uses long- and medium-range 3D surveillance radar to locate, detect and track enemy targets. As well as exchange and coordinate operations with ships and aircraft that participate in the operation Then attack the target with the ESSM missile and the ship's firearm. The long-range air defense or the Battle Group's outer layer will be used in conjunction with Air Force aircraft to search. Detect and attack And surface war operations By being able to attack targets at a distance By practicing with ships and aircraft in identifying targets Hand over the target and use weapons from a distance. Including attacking water and underwater targets with ship helicopters.

Self-defense capabilities are  surface-to-air missile, naval artillery, antiaircraft secondary guns, CIWS, electronic decoys, centralized or discrete damage control systems. There is a control system for broadcasting signals from the hull.

Electronic warfare capabilities It can detect, intercept, analyze and disrupt the target's electromagnetic signal.

Capabilities in joint combat operations Through the tactical information link system To be able to operate in a joint battle in the form of a Battle Group effectively and efficiently. Including combat operations with Air force aircraft According to the role that will be assigned Which high-performance frigates Will mainly control the submarine.

Gallery

See also
 List of naval ship classes in service
 List of equipment in Royal Thai Navy

References 

2017 ships
Bhumibol Adulyadej–class frigates
Ships built by Daewoo Shipbuilding & Marine Engineering